Bill Cole is the current Mayor of Billings, Montana.

Early life and education 
Cole was born and raised in Bozeman, Montana. He earned a Bachelor's degree in history from Dartmouth College and received his Juris Doctor degree from Columbia Law School. Cole and his wife, Anne, returned to Billings in 1991, where he practiced law and she is a professor at Montana State University.

Career 
Before entering local politics, Cole practiced real estate, land use, and commercial contracts law. He also served as chair of the Billings Chamber of Commerce. Cole was elected on November 7, 2017, succeeding two-term mayor, Tom Hanel, who was term-limited. Cole faced member of the Montana Senate, Jeff Essmann, defeating him by 7,000 votes.

References 

Columbia Law School alumni
Dartmouth College alumni
Living people
Mayors of places in Montana
People from Bozeman, Montana
Year of birth missing (living people)